Georgije (is a Serbian masculine given name, derived from the Greek Georgios.

It is, along with the variants Đorđe, Đurađ and Đuraš, the equivalent of the English George. The surname Georgijević stems from the name.

The name's name day is on 6 May.

It may refer to:

 Georgije "Đura" Jakšić
 Georgije Branković
 Georgije Bakalović
 Georgije Mitrofanović
 Georgije Ilić
 Georgije Magarašević
 Georgije Ostrogorski
 Georgije Đokić
 Georgije Bogić
 Georgije Hranislav

See also
 Đura, diminutive

References

Further reading
 

Serbian masculine given names